The Mylonas Rifle, usually referred as the Greek Mylonas M1872 is a Greek-designed falling-block black powder rifle. It was designed and developed in 1872 by Greek Artillery Major Efstathios Mylonas (Ευστάθιος Μυλωνάς), while working in the Athens technical facility of the Greek Military Material Authority ("Eforeia Ylikou Polemou", EYP). The 11-mm caliber rifle was a modification of the M1870 Belgian Comblain but with a larger protruding hammer and uniquely styled actuating lever. It was adopted by the Greek Army and, as there was no facility in the country able to produce quantities with the required rate, its construction was ordered to Emile et Leon Nagant of Liège, Belgium. Thus, only the prototype was built in Greece. The Mylonas was shortly replaced by the M1874 French Gras rifle considered superior by the Greek Army. The Gras used the same chambering as the Mylonas, though it was introduced two years later, leading to speculation that the Gras's cartridge was based on the Mylonas's. The Mylonas rifle was used during the Thessaly campaign of 1878 and as a reserve in later conflicts, while some equipped police units. Due to its early replacement, a total of only approximately 8500 were built. Today Mylonas rifles are considered collectible items.

References

Christos Sazanidis, "Ta opla ton Ellinon (The weapons of the Greeks)", Maiandros, Thessaloniki, 1995.

External links

Military Rifles - Mylonas

Falling-block rifles
Early rifles
Rifles of Greece